Elgin Sheriff Court is a municipal structure in the High Street, Elgin, Moray, Scotland. The structure, which was the headquarters of Morayshire County Council and remains in use as a courthouse, is a Category B listed building.

History
The first judicial building in the town was a 16th century timber-framed tolbooth in the middle of the High Street in which burgh court and county meetings were held. It was rebuilt in stone the early 17th century and replaced by a combined jail, court house and town hall in the early 18th century. This, in turn, was replaced by a dedicated courthouse on the south side of the High Street which was designed by William Robertson and completed in 1837.

By the early 1860s, Robertson's courthouse was deemed inadequate, and it was decided to commission a new structure to the immediate east of the existing courthouse to be known as "County Buildings". The new building was designed by Robertson's nephews, Alexander and William Reid, in the neoclassical style, built in ashlar stone and was officially opened on 14 January 1866. The design involved a symmetrical main frontage with five bays facing onto the High Street. The central section of three bays, which slightly projected forward, featured a recessed doorway flanked by two sash windows. On the first floor, the central section was fenestrated by sash windows fronted by balustrades; the central window was flanked by Ionic order columns and the outer windows were flanked by Ionic order pilasters all supporting an entablature, a modillioned cornice and a parapet, which was originally decorated by ten urns. The outer bays were fenestrated by sash windows on both floors and were surmounted by an entablature and a modillioned cornice, but no parapet. All the windows on the ground floor, which was rusticated, featured keystones while all the windows on the first floor were surmounted by cornices supported by brackets. Internally, the principal room was a new courtroom which featured a large portrait of Sheriff-Substitute Patrick Cameron.

Following the implementation of the Local Government (Scotland) Act 1889, which established county councils in every county, the new county leaders needed to identify offices for Morayshire County Council. The new county council initially established its offices in the Reid brothers' building. However, in the late 1920s, it was decided that the county council needed more space for its offices; Robertson's original courthouse was demolished in 1930 and replaced by a new eleven-bay structure which was completed after the Second World War and became the new "County Buildings". The Reid brothers' building then became "Elgin Sheriff Court".

After the abolition of Morayshire County Council in 1975, County Buildings was taken over by Moray District Council while the Reid brothers' building continued to be used for hearings of the sheriff court and, on one day a month, for hearings of the justice of the peace court. The Reid brothers' building was extended to the rear by three bays in a similar style in 1993.

See also
 List of listed buildings in Elgin, Moray

References

Government buildings completed in 1866
County halls in Scotland
Category B listed buildings in Moray
Court buildings in Scotland